Precursor or Precursors may refer to:
Precursor (religion), a forerunner, predecessor
 The Precursor, John the Baptist

Science and technology
 Precursor (bird), a hypothesized genus of fossil birds that was composed of fossilized parts of unrelated animals
 Precursor (chemistry), a compound that participates in the chemical reaction that produces another compound
 Precursor (physics), a phenomenon of wave propagation in dispersive media
 Precursor in the course of a disease, a state preceding a particular stage in that course
 Precursor cell (biology), a unipotent stem cell
 Earthquake precursor, a diagnostic phenomenon that can occur before an earthquake
 Gehrlein Precursor, a glider
 LNWR Precursor Class (disambiguation), classes of passenger locomotives developed for the London and North Western Railway

Fiction
Precursors Halo (series), an extremely advanced race that preceded and were destroyed by The Forerunners
 Precursor (novel), a 1999 novel set in C. J. Cherryh's Foreigner universe
Precursors, a fictional race (now extinct) of ancient beings in the board game Cosmic Encounter
Precursors, a fictional alien race in the Star Control video game series
Precursors, a fictional race of ancient beings in the video game Jak and Daxter: The Precursor Legacy
Precursors, a fictional alien race in Galactic Civilizations II: Dread Lords video game
Precursors, a fictional, almost extinct alien race that supposedly created humanity in the Assassin's Creed series
Precursors, a fictional, evil alien race that created the Kaiju in the movie Pacific Rim and its sequel Pacific Rim: Uprising
Precursors, a fictional and extremely advanced alien race in the video game Subnautica.

Other
Precursors of film
The Precursors (video game), a video game from Kyiv-based developer Deep Shadows